Acylamino-acid-releasing enzyme is an enzyme that in humans is encoded by the APEH gene.

This gene encodes the enzyme acylpeptide hydrolase, which catalyzes the hydrolysis of the terminal acetylated amino acid preferentially from small acetylated peptides. The acetyl amino acid formed by this hydrolase is further processed to acetate and a free amino acid by an aminoacylase. This gene is located within the same region of chromosome 3 (3p21) as the aminoacylase gene, and deletions at this locus are also associated with a decrease in aminoacylase activity. The acylpeptide hydrolase is a homotetrameric protein of 300 kDa with each subunit consisting of 732 amino acid residues. It can play an important role in destroying oxidatively-damaged proteins in living cells. Deletions of this gene locus are found in various types of carcinomas, including small-cell lung carcinoma and renal cell carcinoma.

References

External links

Further reading